Erin Wesley Hartwell (born June 10, 1969) is an American cyclist. He won the silver medal in the Men's track time trial in the 1996 Summer Olympics and a bronze medal in the Men's track time trial in 1992 Summer Olympics.

References

External links 
 

1969 births
Living people
Cyclists at the 1992 Summer Olympics
Cyclists at the 1996 Summer Olympics
Cyclists at the 2000 Summer Olympics
Olympic silver medalists for the United States in cycling
Olympic bronze medalists for the United States in cycling
American male cyclists
Sportspeople from Philadelphia
Medalists at the 1996 Summer Olympics
Medalists at the 1992 Summer Olympics
Pan American Games medalists in cycling
Pan American Games silver medalists for the United States
American track cyclists
Cyclists at the 1991 Pan American Games
Medalists at the 1991 Pan American Games
20th-century American people
21st-century American people